Jetmore Municipal Airport  is a city-owned, public-use airport seven miles south of Jetmore, a city in Hodgeman County, Kansas, United States.

Facilities and aircraft 
Jetmore Municipal Airport covers an area of 1,181 acres (478 ha) at an elevation of 2,466 feet (752 m) above mean sea level. It has one runway designated 17/35 with an asphalt/concrete surface measuring 4,205 by 75 feet (1,282 x 23 m). For the 12-month period ending August 13, 2010, the airport had 600 general aviation aircraft operations, an average of 50 per month.

References

External links 
  from Kansas DOT Airport Directory
 Aerial image as of September 1991 from USGS The National Map
 

Airports in Kansas
Hodgeman County, Kansas